The DeSoto Powermaster was an automobile built by DeSoto during model years 1952 to 1954. The car debuted during DeSoto's 25th anniversary, taking the place of the entry-level DeSoto Deluxe.

The Powermaster was a full-size car, offered in pillared two and four-door sedan and station wagon models, and powered by Chrysler's  DeSoto I6 engine. For both of its years in production, the Powermaster was available as an eight-passenger sedan through the use of jump seats, called the DeSoto Suburban.  The Powermaster was also built on a longer wheelbase than regular six-passenger DeSotos.  A version of the long wheelbase model was used as a basis for the DeSoto Taxi, seen in many Hollywood movies from the late 1930s through the mid-1950s.

The cars also featured a curved windshield, replacing the two piece windshield used on previous models. Passenger compartment heater, electric clock, power brakes, power steering and white sidewall tires were all available as options.

Powermasters built early in the 1953 model year had minimal chrome trim due to Korean War demands; more trim was added as defense demands decreased.

Chrysler of Canada built the DeSoto Powermaster in both 4-door sedan and 2-door hardtop body styles, the latter not offered in the United States.  The Canadian DeSoto Powermaster also used Chrysler's  flathead I6, an engine that first appeared in the 1952 Chrysler Windsor.

The Powermaster was dropped at the beginning of the 1955 model year, when DeSoto transitioned all of its automotive models to DeSoto Firedome V8 engines.

References

Powermaster
Rear-wheel-drive vehicles
Full-size vehicles
Coupés
Sedans
Station wagons
Cars introduced in 1952